Ratko Jović; is an urban neighborhood in Niš. It is located in municipality of Crveni Krst.

Location 
Neighborhood is located in north-west part of the city. On the north and east it's bordered by boulevard of Nikola Tesla, on the south by industrial zone, and on the west by Constantine the Great Airport. Airport itself is sometimes included in Ratko Jović. River Hum flows throughout the neighborhood. The residential area of the neighborhood is around 0.7 square kilometers. Its population is between 2,500 and 3,000 people.

History 
The neighborhood was created in 1960s in order to connect village of Donji Komren with the City of Niš. In the beginning it was named Novi Komren, but later the name was changed to Ratko Jović. Ratomir Ratko Jović was a Yugoslav World War 2 hero. Since then it became the industrial centre of the city, with many factories such as: Kopex MIN, Johnson Electric, NIS and Jastrebac. In 2012, Russian-Serbian Humanitarian Centre was opened.

Transportation 
Constantine the Great Airport is an international airport that connects with Niš many European cities, such as Zürich, Bratislava, Bergamo and Vienna. The Pan-European Corridor X Branch C is bordering the neighborhood at connects it to Sofia. Boulevards of Nikola Tesla and 12 February are passing throughout Ratko Jović.

References 

Neighborhoods of Niš